FCN may refer to:

Sport
 FC Nantes
 FC Nordsjælland
 FC Nöttingen
 1. FC Nürnberg
 FC Nenzing

Transport
 Falconwood railway station (National Rail station code), in London
 Sea-Airport Cuxhaven/Nordholz (IATA code), in Nordholz, Germany

Other uses
 Faith community nursing
 Federal Center of Neurosurgery (Tyumen), in Russia
 Federal Convention of Namibia
 Federation of Canadian Naturists
 Ficolin
 Free Charging Network
 FTI Consulting, an American professional services company
 Function (mathematics)
 National Convergence Front, a political party in Guatemala
 the chemical compound Cyanogen fluoride